Get It Straight with Daniel Razon is a current affairs-talk show-reality show in the Philippines, hosted by Daniel Razon aired on UNTV. It first appeared on July 5, 2010, and aired early morning of Weekdays at 6:45 AM – 7:30 AM. In 2013 the new timeslot was 30 minutes long from 7:30 AM to 8:00 AM. In August 2015 it was extended to 1 hour and the new timeslot is from 8:00 AM – 9:00 AM, (PST). It comes with a producer's cut edition in the evening at 6:45 PM and 8:30 PM. In 2020, the program is aired every Mondays, Wednesdays and Fridays at 8:30  AM to 9:30 AM.

Its guests are mostly government officials and personalities including the private sector, the program discusses issues and information for the interest of its viewers and the public.

Host
 Daniel Razon

Awards
 2011 Golden Screen TV Awards – Outstanding Celebrity Talk Program Finalist
 Gandingan Awards (5TH UPLB Isko't Iska's Broadcast Choice Awards)- Best Development-Oriented Talk Show Finalist
 2012 Gandingan Awards (6TH UPLB Isko't Iska's Broadcast Choice Awards)- Best Development-Oriented Talk Show Finalist
 2013 Gandingan Awards (6TH UPLB Isko't Iska's Broadcast Choice Awards)- Best Development-Oriented Talk Show Finalist

Episodes

January 2018–December 2018

May 2018–March 2019 (2019 Midterm Elections interviews)

February 2019–present

See also
Progressive Broadcasting Corporation 
UNTV Public Service 
Daniel Razon
Good Morning Kuya

References

External links 
 Daniel Razon Official Website
 Get it Straight with Daniel Razon - DanielRazon.com | Daniel Razon
 Get it Straight with Daniel Razon :: UNTVWEB - Your Public Service Channel

Members Church of God International
UNTV (Philippines) original programming
2010 Philippine television series debuts
Philippine television talk shows
Filipino-language television shows
English-language television shows